Bagh-e Yek (also Romanized as Bāgh-e Yek and Bāgh Yek; also known as Bāghak and Bāqak) is a village in Rahjerd-e Sharqi Rural District, Salafchegan District, Qom County, Qom Province, Iran. At the 2006 census, its population was 94, in 29 families. Bagh-e Yek is located in the region of Qom, and it is located about 95 mi (or 153 km) south-west of Tehran, the country's capital.

References 

Populated places in Qom Province